The Biloxi Public School District is a public school district based in Biloxi, Mississippi (USA). Most of the district serves Biloxi.

Schools

High school
Grades 9-12
Biloxi Senior High School

Junior high schools
Grades 7-8
Biloxi Junior High School

Elementary schools
Grades K-6
Biloxi Upper Elementary School
Gorenflo Elementary School
Back Bay Elementary School
North Bay Elementary School
Popp's Ferry Elementary School

Demographics

2006-07 school year
There were a total of 4,711 students enrolled in the Biloxi Public School District during the 2006–2007 school year. The gender makeup of the district was 49% female and 51% male. The racial makeup of the district was 33.45% African American, 54.43% White, 4.82% Hispanic, 7.07% Asian, and 0.23% Native American. 47.7% of the district's students were eligible to receive free lunch.

Previous school years

Accountability statistics

See also

List of school districts in Mississippi

References

External links
 

Biloxi, Mississippi
Education in Harrison County, Mississippi
School districts in Mississippi